W. V. Wolfe was an American sound engineer. He was nominated for an Academy Award in the category Sound Recording for the film Three Is a Family.

Selected filmography
 Three Is a Family (1944)

References

External links

Year of birth missing
Year of death missing
American audio engineers